The Skyrocket name was used by Bellanca for a number of different aircraft:

 the Bellanca CH-400 Skyrocket
 the Bellanca D Skyrocket
 the Bellanca F Skyrocket
 the Bellanca F-1 Skyrocket
 the Bellanca F-2 Skyrocket

as well as:

 the Bellanca 19-25 Skyrocket II
 the Bellanca 31-50 and 31-55 Skyrocket Senior